Yuandian is a town of Shanzhou District, Sanmenxia, Henan, China. The town had a population of 37,055 in 2005.

Sanmenxia West railway station of the Longhai railway is located in the town.

History 
In 1958 it was part of Daying commune. Yuandian town was established in 1962.

A Miaodigou culture (4,400 - 5,500 years ago) archeological site has been found in the town.

Administrative divisions 
As of 2016, the town was divided in 6 residential communities and 5 administrative villages.

Residential communities

 Middle community (中区)
 Dongyi community ('North 1', 东一区)
 Dong'er community ('North 2', 东二区)
 West community (西区)
 North community (北区)
 Market community (市场区)

Villages

 Yuandian (原店村)
 Guojia (郭家村)
 Xinjian (新建村)
 Zhaigen (寨根村)
 Chali (岔里村)

References 

Township-level divisions of Henan